a.k.a. 'Torasan Appears in a Dream is a 1972 Japanese comedy film directed by Yoji Yamada. It stars Kiyoshi Atsumi as Torajirō Kuruma (Tora-san), and Kaoru Yachigusa as his love interest or "Madonna". Tora-san's Dream-Come-True is the tenth entry in the popular, long-running Otoko wa Tsurai yo series.

Synopsis
When Tora-san returns to visit his family, he is surprised to find an arrogant professor occupying his room. The professor and Tora-san become rivals for the affection of Chiyo. Both lose, and the professor leaves for America while Tora-san returns to his travels.

Cast
 Kiyoshi Atsumi as Torajiro
 Chieko Baisho as Sakura
 Kaoru Yachigusa as Chiyo Shimura
 Masakane Yonekura as Prof. Kin'nosuke Okakura
 Tatsuo Matsumura as Kuruma Tatsuzō
 Chieko Misaki as Tsune Kuruma (Torajiro's aunt)
 Gin Maeda as Hiroshi Suwa
 Hayato Nakamura as Mitsuo Suwa
 Masaaki Tsusaka as Kawamata Noboru
 Hisao Dazai as Tarō Ume
 Gajirō Satō as Genkō
 Masao Shimizu as Yunaka

Critical appraisal
Yoji Yamada was given the Best Director prize at the Mainichi Film Awards for Tora-san's Dream-Come-True and the next entry in the series, Tora-san's Forget Me Not (1973). Stuart Galbraith IV writes that the film is hit-and-miss, with some amusing sequences, but suffers due to the overly clownish professor character. One of the highlights of the film, according to Galbraith, is the performance of the noted actress and director Kinuyo Tanaka. The German-language site molodezhnaja gives Tora-san's Dream-Come-True three out of five stars.

Availability
Tora-san's Dream-Come-True was released theatrically on December 29, 1972. In Japan, the film was released on videotape in 1995, and in DVD format in 2005 and 2008.

References

Bibliography

English

German

Japanese

External links
 Tora-san's Dream-Come-True at www.tora-san.jp (official site)

1972 films
Films directed by Yoji Yamada
1972 comedy films
1970s Japanese-language films
Otoko wa Tsurai yo films
Shochiku films
Films with screenplays by Yôji Yamada
Japanese sequel films
1970s Japanese films